USS Tangier has been the name of more than one United States Navy ship, and may refer to:

, a patrol vessel in commission from 1917 to 1918
, a seaplane tender in commission from 1941 to 1947

Tangier, USS